James Umpherston McLean (2 May 1880 – 14 August 1917) was an Australian rules footballer who played with Melbourne in the Victorian Football League (VFL).

Notes

External links 

1880 births
1917 deaths
Australian rules footballers from Victoria (Australia)
Melbourne Football Club players
Euroa Football Club players